In enzymology, a trans-2-enoyl-CoA reductase (NAD+) is an enzyme that catalyzes the chemical reaction

trans-2,3-dehydroacyl-CoA + NADH + H+  acyl-CoA + NAD+

Thus, the three substrates of this enzyme are trans-didehydroacyl-CoA, NADH, and H+, whereas its two products are acyl-CoA and NAD+.

This enzyme belongs to the family of oxidoreductases, specifically those acting on the CH-CH group of donor with NAD+ or NADP+ as acceptor.  The systematic name of this enzyme class is acyl-CoA:NAD+ trans-2-oxidoreductase. This enzyme is also called trans-2-enoyl-CoA reductase (NAD+).  This enzyme participates in butanoate metabolism.

References

 

EC 1.3.1
NADH-dependent enzymes
Enzymes of unknown structure